The Dodge Super 8 Hemi was a concept car created by Dodge. It was first introduced at the 2001 North American International Auto Show. It is a combination of the classic design from Dodge's past vehicles and the design from Dodge's SUVs and trucks.  It was also featured in Midnight Club 3: DUB Edition Remix.

Engine
In the Super 8 Hemi is a Chrysler 5.7-liter EZB/EZD HEMI OHV V8 engine. The Super 8 Hemi will go from 0-60 in about 5.7 seconds. The Super 8 Hemi uses a four-speed automatic transmission with an Autostick.

External links
Hot Wheels Guide - 2005 First Editions 
     Automotive Intelligence Article for the Super 8 Hemi

Super 8 Hemi